The 2000 Yukon general election was held on April 17, 2000 to elect members of the 30th Yukon Legislative Assembly in the Yukon Territory in Canada. The incumbent NDP government was defeated by the Liberal Party, which formed a majority government.

Standings

|- style="background:#ccc;"
! rowspan="2" colspan="2" style="text-align:left;"|Party
! rowspan="2" style="text-align:left;"|Party leader
!rowspan="2"|Candidates
! colspan="4" style="text-align:center;"|Seats
!colspan="3" style="text-align:center;"|Popular vote
|- style="background:#ccc;"
| style="text-align:center;"|1996
| style="text-align:center;font-size: 80%;"|Dissol.
| style="text-align:center;"|2000
| style="text-align:center;"|Change
| style="text-align:center;"|#
| style="text-align:center;"|%
| style="text-align:center;"|Change

|align=left|Pat Duncan
|align="right"|17
|align="right"|3
|align="right"|4
|align="right"|10
|align="right"|+7
|align="right"|6,119
|align="right"|42.90%
|align="right"|+18.96%

|align=left|Piers McDonald
|align="right"|17
|align="right"|11
|align="right"|10
|align="right"|6
|align="right"|-5
|align="right"|4,677
|align="right"|32.80%
|align="right"|-7.01%

|align=left|John Ostashek
|align="right"|15
|align="right"|3
|align="right"|3
|align="right"|1
|align="right"|-2
|align="right"|3,466
|align="right"|24.30%
|align="right"|-6.06%
|-
| style="text-align:left;" colspan="3"|Total
| style="text-align:right;"|49
| style="text-align:right;"|17
| style="text-align:right;"|17
| style="text-align:right;"|17
| style="text-align:right;"|
| style="text-align:right;"|14,262
| style="text-align:right;"|100.00%
| style="text-align:right;"|
|}

Member Changes from Previous Election

Liberals form Official Opposition, following Lake Laberge by-election.

Incumbents not Running for Reelection

The following MLAs had announced that they would not be running in the 2000 election:

Liberal Party
Jack Cable (Riverside)

New Democratic Party
Robert Bruce (Vuntut Gwitchin)

Yukon Party
Doug Phillips (Riverdale North)

Results by Riding
Bold indicates party leaders
† - denotes a retiring incumbent MLA

|-
|bgcolor=whitesmoke|Faro
|
|
|
|Jim McLachlan 53
|| 
|Trevor Harding177
|
| 
|| 
|Trevor Harding
|-
|bgcolor=whitesmoke|Klondike
|| 
|Peter Jenkins 424
|
|Stuart Schmidt397
|
|Aedes Scheer249
|
| 
|| 
|Peter Jenkins
|-
|bgcolor=whitesmoke|Kluane
|
|Charlie Eikland208
|
|Gerald Brown113
|| 
|Gary McRobb405
|
| 
|| 
|Gary McRobb 
|-
|bgcolor=whitesmoke|Lake Laberge
|
|Roger Gallagher 363
|| 
|Pam Buckway514
|
|Gary LeGoffe182
|
| 
|| 
|Pam Buckway
|-
|bgcolor=whitesmoke|McIntyre-Takhini
|
|John Edzerza265
|| 
|Wayne Jim376
|
|Piers McDonald338
|
|
|| 
|Piers McDonald
|-
|bgcolor=whitesmoke|Mayo-Tatchun
|
|
|
|Wilf Tuck277
|| 
|Eric Fairclough446
|
|
|| 
|Eric Fairclough
|-
|bgcolor=whitesmoke|Mount Lorne
|
|Ken Gabb269
|| 
|Cynthia Tucker 563
|
|Lois Moorcroft422
|
| 
|| 
|Lois Moorcroft
|-
|bgcolor=whitesmoke|Porter Creek North
|
|John Ostashek323
|| 
|Don Roberts 504
|
|Sidney Maddison 114
|
|
|| 
|John Ostashek
|-
|bgcolor=whitesmoke|Porter Creek South
|
|Larry W Carlyle235
|| 
|Pat Duncan607
|
|Mark Dupuis 103
|
| 
|| 
|Pat Duncan
|-
|bgcolor=whitesmoke|Riverdale North
|
|Daphne White 172
|| 
|Dale Eftoda454
|
|Rachael Lewis 233
|
| 
|| 
|Doug Phillips†
|-
|bgcolor=whitesmoke|Riverdale South
|
|Ginny Macdonald 205
|| 
|Sue Edelman422
|
|Heather Finton 237
|
| 
|| 
|Sue Edelman
|-
|bgcolor=whitesmoke|Riverside
|
|Michael Wienert   100
|| 
|Scott Kent 359
|
|Jasbir Randhawa 202
|
|
|| 
|Jack Cable†
|-
|bgcolor=whitesmoke|Ross River-Southern Lakes
|
|Ed Hall150
|
|Dorothy John 187
|| 
|Dave Keenan 357
|
| 
|| 
|Dave Keenan
|-
|bgcolor=whitesmoke|Vuntut Gwitchin
|
|Kathie Nukon53
|
|Esau Schafer 61
|| 
|Lorraine Netro  69
|
| 
|| 
|Robert Bruce†
|-
|bgcolor=whitesmoke|Watson Lake
|
|Mickey Thomas144
|
|Isaac Wood272
|| 
|Dennis Fentie 434
|
| 
|| 
|Dennis Fentie
|-
|bgcolor=whitesmoke|Whitehorse Centre
|
|Vicki Durrant130
|| 
|Mike McLarnon312
|
|Todd Hardy229
|
|
|| 
|Todd Hardy
|-
|bgcolor=whitesmoke|Whitehorse West
|
|Elaine Taylor 425
|| 
|Dennis Schneider621
|
|David Sloan 480
|
| 
|| 
|David Sloan
|}

References

2000 elections in Canada
2000
Election
April 2000 events in Canada